Guilbaud is a French surname. Notable people with the surname include:

Maëlle Guilbaud (born 1996), French windsurfer
Marie-Pierre Guilbaud (born 1963), French cross country skier
Patrick Guilbaud, French chef
René Guilbaud (1890–1928), French military aviator

French-language surnames